The Iron Cove Bridge is a heritage-listed road bridge that carries Victoria Road (A40) across Iron Cove, linking the Sydney suburbs of Drummoyne to Rozelle in the City of Canada Bay local government area of New South Wales, Australia.

Current bridges 
A decision to replace the original bridge was made in 1939 just prior to the outbreak of World War II. Design work began in 1942 and construction by Hornibrook McKenzie Clarke Pty Ltd commenced in 1947. The bridge was officially opened by the Hon. J.J. Cahill, MLA, Premier and Colonial Treasurer of NSW on 30 July 1955.

Designed by Laurie Challis from the NSW Department of Main Roads, the Iron Cove Bridge is an impressive steel truss bridge. The roadway consists of a  reinforced concrete deck slab with an inset for tram tracks in the centre portion.

The bridge has aesthetically distinctive piers and abutments which reflect the Inter-War Art Deco style. Furthermore, it was the last steel truss bridge to be constructed in New South Wales in which rivets were used for field connections prior to the introduction of high strength bolts.

The bridge was built to carry four lanes of traffic, however a fifth lane was later added to the southwest side of the bridge. This extra lane ran outside of the main bridge supports, forcing traffic to remain in the lane for the length of the bridge. Until the bridge duplication completed in 2011, the default configuration was three westbound and two eastbound lanes, switching to two westbound and three eastbound lanes during the morning peak.

Bridge duplication

In April 2009, the NSW Government approved plans to construct a second bridge over Iron Cove as part of the Inner West Busway along Victoria Road.

During the proposal phase there were strong protests against the duplicate bridge being built from local residents as well as both local area councils of the City of Canada Bay (Drummoyne side) and Leichhardt (Rozelle side). Local residents within both Drummoyne and Rozelle formed the Victoria Road Community and organised public demonstrations, the last of which on 29 March 2009 attracted over 3000 protest marchers. Opposition to the new bridge was based on independent evaluations concluding that there would be only slight improvements to traffic congestion citybound on Victoria Road during peak hour while local congestion would worsen. Additionally, parkland on both sides of the new bridge would be reduced and independent environmental studies showed the local environment detrimentally impacted by the new bridge construction.

Work on the duplicate bridge commenced in July 2009 and the bridge was opened to traffic late on 28 January 2011. The new bridge was constructed on the western side of the 1955 bridge and carries three westbound traffic lanes with one lane designated as a morning peak bus lane. There is also a  grade-separated shared pedestrian footpath and cycleway on the western side of the new bridge which connects to both The Bay Run and Victoria Road. The 1955 bridge now carries three citybound traffic lanes and a 24-hour bus lane. The additional lane of the 1955 bridge outside the bridge supports was closed and is now only used for maintenance reasons.

First bridge 

The original bridge was constructed of wrought iron lattice girders and opened in 1882 after four years of construction. The area was sparsely populated in the 1880s and the opening of the new bridge not only helped accessibility but also provided a new western route to Sydney via Balmain. The old spans were re-used by means of purchase by Gordon Duff. Because of their good resistance to corrosion, all nine of the 1882 bridge's  spans are in current use in three bridges on country roads in the  area. The abutment on the Drummoyne side is listed on the local government heritage list.

See also

 List of bridges in Sydney
 List of Art Deco buildings in Sydney
 The Bay Run, a popular pathway for joggers, walkers and cyclists which passes across Iron Cove Bridge

References

Attribution

Further reading

External links

 Roads and Traffic Authority, New South Wales
 Inner West Busway (RTA)
 Duplication proposal (RTA)
 Local Images at InnerWest ImageBank
 Local History Collection, Leichhardt Council
 Victoria Road Community Committee Inc

Bridges in Sydney
Bridges completed in 1882
Bridges completed in 1955
1955 establishments in Australia
Rozelle, New South Wales
Road bridges in New South Wales
Steel bridges in Australia
Pratt truss bridges
Truss bridges in Australia
Box girder bridges
Concrete bridges in Australia
Bridges completed in 2011
1882 establishments in Australia
1955 disestablishments in Australia
2011 establishments in Australia
Art Deco architecture in Australia